Miriam Naor (26 October 1947 – 24 January 2022) was an Israeli judge who was President of the Supreme Court of Israel from January 2015 to October 2017. Naor retired at the end of October 2017 upon reaching the mandatory judicial retirement age of 70. She was succeeded by Esther Hayut.

Biography
Naor was born in Jerusalem. Naor hailed from a family rooted in the Revisionist Zionist tradition. Her father, Naftaly Lerner,  emigrated from Odessa to Palestine in 1922 and studied civil engineering at the Technion in Haifa. In 1944, he married her mother Batya (née Karklinsky), who immigrated from Lithuania in 1910. She studied nursing at the Hadassah School of Nursing in Jerusalem. 

She graduated from the Hebrew University’s law school in 1971. Her husband, Aryeh Naor, served as Prime Minister Menachem Begin’s cabinet secretary from 1977 to 1982. Her mother-in-law, Esther Raziel-Naor, was a long-serving member of Knesset for Herut (the precursor to Likud) — from 1949 to 1973 and the sister of David Raziel. Her son Naftali — whose godfather was Menachem Begin — ran unsuccessfully in Likud primaries.

Naor died on 24 January 2022, at the age of 74.

Legal and judicial career

Naor clerked for Supreme Court justice (later Chief Justice) Moshe Landau. She worked on constitutional issues in the State Attorney’s Office under Mishael Cheshin, who would later be appointed Deputy Chief Justice.

In 1980 she won her first judicial appointment to the Jerusalem Magistrate’s Court. In May 1989, Naor was appointed to the Jerusalem District Court. Later in the 1990s, she served as one of the judges who eventually convicted Shas chairman Aryeh Deri on bribery charges. She became a permanent justice on the Supreme Court in 2003.

Naor spent 38 years on the bench, 17 of them on the Supreme Court. Her final act was ratifying the verdict allowing Tel Aviv supermarkets and recreation centers to remain open on Shabbat.

In October 2018 she was appointed President of the Zionist Supreme Court of the World Zionist Organization.

See also
 Women in Israel
 Judiciary of Israel

References

1947 births
2022 deaths
Chief justices of the Supreme Court of Israel
Hebrew University of Jerusalem Faculty of Law alumni
Israeli people of Ukrainian-Jewish descent
Israeli people of Lithuanian-Jewish descent
Israeli women judges
Women chief justices
People from Jerusalem